Ralph Kirby was an American football coach. He served as the head football coach at Sterling College in Sterling, Kansas for one season, in 1934, compiling a record of 0–8.

Head coaching record

References

Year of birth missing
Year of death missing
Sterling Warriors football coaches